The 2009–10 I liga was the 62nd season of the second tier domestic division in the Polish football league system since its establishment in 1949 and the 2nd season of the Polish I liga under its current title. The league was operated by the Polish Football Association (PZPN).

The league is contested by 18 teams who competing for promotion to the 2010–11 Ekstraklasa. The regular season was played in a round-robin tournament. The champions and runners-up would receive promotion. Unlike in previous seasons the third-placed team no longer had the opportunity to compete in playoffs for promotion, while the 13th and 14th placed teams no longer had to compete in play-outs to remain in the I liga. The bottom four teams were automatically demoted to the II liga.

The season began on 1 August 2009, and concluded on 9 June 2010. After the 19th matchday the league will be on winter break between 22 November 2009 and 5 March 2010.

Changes from last season
Promotion and relegation from 2008–09 season.
Relegated from Ekstraklasa to I liga:
 Górnik Zabrze
 ŁKS Łódź

Promoted from 2008–09 II liga to I liga:
 KSZO Ostrowiec Świętokrzyski 
 MKS Kluczbork 
 Pogoń Szczecin 
 Sandecja Nowy Sącz

Others
 Widzew Łódź won the I liga in 2008-09 but were relegated for prior corruption, hence remaining in the league. Initially, they were also docked six points, however, this decision was overturned in September. 
 Motor Lublin replaced GKS Jastrzębie who were not successful in their application for a license to play in the league.
 ŁKS Łódź, although not deserving it sportingly, were also relegated from the Ekstraklasa due to license problems.

League table

Results

Season statistics

Top scorers

References

External links
Official website 

2009–10 in Polish football
Pol
I liga seasons